András Sike (born 18 July 1965) is a retired bantamweight Greco-Roman wrestler from Hungary. He competed at the 1988 and 1992 Olympics and won a gold medal in 1988. Between 1988 and 1991 he also won four medals at the world and European championships. After retiring from competitions he ran his own restaurant.

References

1965 births
Living people
Olympic wrestlers of Hungary
Wrestlers at the 1988 Summer Olympics
Wrestlers at the 1992 Summer Olympics
Hungarian male sport wrestlers
Olympic gold medalists for Hungary
Olympic medalists in wrestling
Medalists at the 1988 Summer Olympics
Sportspeople from Eger
20th-century Hungarian people